The 2013 Men's European Volleyball League was the tenth edition of the annual Men's European Volleyball League, which featured men's national volleyball teams from twelve European countries. A preliminary league round was played from June 13 to July 7, and the final four tournament, which was held in Turkey on July 13–14, 2013.

For this years edition, the first four sets were played over 21 points.

Belgium defeated Croatia 3–0 in the final.

Teams

League round

Pool A

|}

Leg 1
The tournament was played at Budocenter, Vienna, Austria.

|}

Leg 2
The tournament was played at Antvorskovhallen, Slagelse, Denmark.

|}

Leg 3
The tournament was played in Sporthal Arena, Deurne, Belgium.

|}

Leg 4
The tournament was played in City Hall, Nitra, Slovakia.

|}

Pool B

|}

Leg 1
The tournament was played at Messzi István Sportcsarnok, Kecskemét, Hungary.

|}

Leg 2
The tournament was played at Pavelló de la Vall d'Hebron, Barcelona, Spain.

|}

Leg 3
The tournament was played in Mediteranski Sportski Centar, Budva, Montenegro.

|}

Leg 4
The tournament was played in Sports Hall, Opava, Czech Republic.

|}

Pool C

|}

Leg 1
The tournament was played at Dvorana "Gimnasium", Rovinj, Croatia.

|}

Leg 2
The tournament was played at Metrowest Sport Palace, Ra'anana, Israel.

|}

Leg 3
The tournament was played in Cengiz Göllü Volleyball Hall, Bursa, Turkey.

|}

Leg 4
The tournament was played in SK Olimpiets, Mogilev, Belarus.

|}

Final four
The Final Four was held at the Amiral Orhan Aydın Sports Hall in Marmaris, Turkey from July 13 to 14, 2013.

Qualified teams

 (Hosts)

Bracket

Semifinals

|}

Third place game

|}

Final

|}

Final standing

Awards

Most Valuable Player
  Bram Van den Dries
Best Scorer
  Ivan Raič
Best Spiker
  Michal Finger
Best Blocker
  Tomáš Široký

Best Server
  Matthias Valkiers
Best Setter
  Simo-Pekka Olli
Best Receiver
  Adam Bartos
Best Libero
  Stijn Dejonckheere

References

External links
Official website

2013 Men
Men's European Volleyball League
League
2013 Men's European Volleyball League
2013 Men's European Volleyball League